Lyngør is a village area on a group of small islands in the municipality of Tvedestrand in Agder county, off the southeast coast of Norway. The village is located on the islands of Holmen, Odden, Lyngøya and Steinsøya. The Lyngør Lighthouse lies at the northeast edge of the village area.

History
Previously, the village was a popular home for sea captains since it is only accessible by boat and it has no cars. The village is well-known for its scenic harbour and wooden houses. It is recognized as one of the best-preserved communities in Europe.  Most of the buildings are now summer homes, but there are still about 75 permanent, year-round residents (in 2017). A popular destination in the summer months, it has more recently struggled to maintain a stable permanent population since it has no road connections to the mainland. The community has a sail-making factory, a few restaurants that are open during the tourist season, and a general store.

The strait that goes through Lyngør is also well known for the dramatic Battle of Lyngør during the Napoleonic Wars, in which the British Royal Navy effectively put an end to the last of Dano-Norwegian naval forces. The wreck of the Danish frigate Najaden was discovered in the strait in 1957.

Media gallery

Climate

References

Villages in Agder
Tvedestrand